Saltah (Arabic: سلتة) is a traditional Yemeni dish. Saltah is considered to be the national dish of Yemen. In the Ottoman Empire, saltah was used as a charitable food and was made with leftover food that was donated by the wealthy or the mosques. It is widely eaten in northern parts of the country. It is mainly served for lunch. The base is a brown meat stew called maraq, a dollop of fenugreek froth, and sahawiq (a mixture of chillies, tomatoes, garlic, and herbs ground into a salsa). Rice, potatoes, scrambled eggs, and vegetables are common additions to saltah. It is eaten traditionally with khubz mulawah, a Yemeni flatbread used as a utensil to scoop up the dish.

Saltah is an old Yemeni dish that some say is thousands of years old. It is said that its ingredients were only maraq and hulbah (fenugreek). It has been developing since then and is split into two dishes: saltah and fahsah. Saltah is traditionally cooked in a hardened clay-pot known as a haradah.

See also
 List of stews

References
Sources
 Sanaa restaurants serving Saltah
Back story and origin of saltah

Citations

Arab cuisine
Saltah
National dishes